Simple public-key infrastructure
EPA Safer Detergents Stewardship Initiative (SDSI)